Claudette Colvin: Twice Toward Justice is a 2009 young adult nonfiction book by Phillip Hoose, recounting the experiences of Claudette Colvin in Montgomery, Alabama, during the Civil Rights Movement.

Critical reception
Claudette Colvin: Twice Toward Justice gained generally positive reviews from critics. They praised the young adult biography for giving Colvin the recognition she never received back in 1955. The Wall Street Journal said "History might have forgotten Claudette Colvin, or relegated her to footnote status, had writer Phillip Hoose not stumbled upon her name in the course of other research and tracked her down." And the Chicago Tribune says, “Hoose makes the moments in Montgomery come alive, whether it’s about Claudette’s neighborhood, her attorneys, her pastor or all the different individuals in the civil rights movement who paths she crossed . . . . An engrossing read.”

Awards and distinctions
2009 winner, National Book Award for Young People's Literature
2010 Newbery Honor Book
2010 Robert F. Sibert Honor Book
2010 finalist, Young Adult Library Services Association (YALSA) Award for Excellence in Nonfiction for Young Adults
2014 list, YALSA Outstanding Books for the College Bound and Lifelong Learners: History and Cultures
2009 Top Ten list, Amazon.com's Editors' Picks: Best Books for Teens
2010 list, Cooperative Children's Book Center Choices
2010 Honor Book for Older Children, Jane Addams Children's Book Awards
2009 list, Booklist Top 10 Biographies for Youth
2009 Nonfiction list, Publishers Weekly Best Children's Books of the Year
2011 Master List, Dorothy Canfield Fisher Children's Book Award
2010 Nonfiction list, Chicago Public Library Best of the Best

See also

Minty: A Story of Young Harriet Tubman
Sojourner Truth: Ain't I a Woman?

References

Biographies about African-American people
Children's non-fiction books
National Book Award-winning works
Newbery Honor-winning works
Montgomery bus boycott
American children's books
2009 children's books
2009 non-fiction books
Books about Alabama